The Slapstick Festival is an annual event in Bristol, United Kingdom. During the festival, which was created in 2005 by Bristol Silents, there are screenings of silent, classic, and visual comedy films. The intent of the festival is to introduce these films to a modern audience and bring them to life for a new generation of viewers. Most silent films are presented with musicians performing the score live, introductions by special guests, and various special events throughout the festival. The festival also produces one-off events throughout the year, such as the Tiswas reunion show at St George's on 16 April 2022,  which reunited Bob Carolgees, John Gorman, Sally James and Chris Tarrant from the 1970s children's Saturday morning television show.

Awards

Aardman Slapstick Comedy Legend Award 
The Slapstick Festival presents this award in collaboration with Aardman Animations, whose winner is selected by a panel of patrons and supporters. It is given to contemporary comedians who have contributed significantly to the art of silent and visual comedy. The award itself features the Aardman character Morph sculpted into the guise of the recipient.

Past winners:

 2013: June Whitfield
 2014: Barry Humphries
 2015: Barry Cryer
 2016: Ken Dodd
 2017: Dawn French and Jennifer Saunders

Aardman Slapstick Visual Comedy Award 
The award was created to recognise the achievements of comedians in the field of visual comedy. The award is also a Morph sculpted to resemble the recipient.

Past winners:

 2009: Eric Sykes
 2010: Michael Palin
 2011: The Goodies
 2012: Pierre Étaix
 2015: Vic Reeves and Bob Mortimer
 2016: Michael Crawford

References

External links

Film festivals in England
Festivals in Bristol
Slapstick comedy